In mathematics the nth central binomial coefficient is the particular binomial coefficient

 

They are called central since they show up exactly in the middle of the even-numbered rows in Pascal's triangle. The first few central binomial coefficients starting at n = 0 are:

Properties

The central binomial coefficients represent the number of combinations of a set where there are an equal number of two types of objects.

For example,  represents AABB, ABAB, ABBA, BAAB, BABA, BBAA.

They also represent the number of combinations of A and B where there are never more B 's than A 's.

For example,  represents AAAA, AAAB, AABA, AABB, ABAA, ABAB.

Generating function

The ordinary generating function for the central binomial coefficients is

This can be proved using the binomial series and the relation

where  is a generalized binomial coefficient.

The central binomial coefficients have exponential generating function

where I0 is a modified Bessel function of the first kind.

The generating function of the squares of the central binomial coefficients can be written in terms of the complete elliptic integral of the first kind:

Asymptotic growth

The Wallis product can be written using limits:

because .

Taking the square root of both sides gives the asymptote for the central binomial coefficient:

.

The latter can also be established by means of Stirling's formula. On the other hand, it can also be used as a means to determine the constant  in front of the Stirling formula.

Approximations

Some better bounds are

Related sequences
The closely related Catalan numbers Cn are given by:

A slight generalization of central binomial coefficients is to take them as

The powers of two that divide the central binomial coefficients are given by Gould's sequence, whose nth element is the number of odd integers in row n of Pascal's triangle.

Squaring the generating function gives

Comparing the coefficients of  gives

For example, .

Other information

Half the central binomial coefficient  (for )  is seen in Wolstenholme's theorem.

By the Erdős squarefree conjecture, proved in 1996, no central binomial coefficient with n > 4 is squarefree.

 is the sum of the squares of the n-th row of Pascal's Triangle:

For example, .

Erdős uses central binomial coefficients extensively in his proof of Bertrand's postulate.

Another noteworthy fact is that the power of 2 dividing  is exactly .

See also 
 Central trinomial coefficient

References

 .

External links
 

Factorial and binomial topics